The Cedar Creek District, also known as the Cedar Creek Locality Archaeological Site, is a Pleistocene archaeological site near Carnegie, Washita County, Oklahoma. The site was inhabited by early humans during the late Pleistocene; these humans used stone tools to hunt herd animals in the area. Artifacts recovered from the site include projectile points, a mammoth skeleton, and fireplace lenses. At the time of its discovery, it was the sole known Pleistocene habitation site in the eastern Great Plains.

The site was added to the National Register of Historic Places on May 29, 1975.

References

External links
Cedar Creek Locality Archaeological Site at the Oklahoma State Historic Preservation Office website

Archaeological sites on the National Register of Historic Places in Oklahoma
Geography of Washita County, Oklahoma
Paleo-Indian archaeological sites in the United States
National Register of Historic Places in Washita County, Oklahoma